The Grand Jubilee of 1814 was a public holiday and celebration in the United Kingdom held on 1 August 1814.  The event marked the 100th anniversary of the accession of George I, the first king of the House of Hanover, the 16th anniversary of Horatio Nelson's victory at the Battle of the Nile and the recent signing of the Treaty of Paris, bringing an end (briefly) to the Napoleonic Wars.

Celebrations centred on the  Royal Parks in London.  At St James's Park a new Chinese-style bridge (with pagoda) and a Temple of Concorde were built and a fireworks display was held.  In Hyde Park a naval re-enactment took place on The Serpentine and in Green Park a naval arch and royal booth were constructed.  The event was billed as "the largest fair, for every kind of amusement, that was ever known in this or any other country" and government employees were granted a public holiday.

Occasion
The jubilee was held to mark the centenary of the accession of George I, the first king of the House of Hanover, who came to the throne on 1 August 1714 (in the Old Style calendar).  The event also marked the 16th anniversary of the first day of the Battle of the Nile and was a celebration of the recent signing of the Treaty of Paris that brought peace with France after more than a decade of the Napoleonic Wars.  It was advertised variously as the Jubilee, the Grand Jubilee, the National Jubilee, the Universal Jubilee and the Grand National Jubilee.  To mark the occasion a public holiday was granted to government employees.

St James's Park 

The event was centred on London's Royal Parks, which were lit with lanterns during the night. The Prince Regent's personal architect John Nash was commissioned to design a Chinese-style bridge and pagoda across the canal in St James's Park. A "Temple of Discorde" was erected in Green Park which, by means of a mechanism designed by Sir William Congreve and under cover of firework display, transformed into a "Temple of Concorde".  During the fireworks display aeronaut Windham William Sadler ascended in a hot air balloon and distributed favours and programmes onto the crowd below.  Also a sign reading "PEACE" was illuminated.  During the jubilee night Nash's pagoda set alight and at least one man, James Taylor, was killed.

Elsewhere 

Queen Charlotte held "grand entertainment" at Buckingham House on the day of the jubilee, with new ornaments being provided for the occasion.   A flotilla of boats paraded down the River Thames and there was a re-enactment of several naval battles against the French on The Serpentine in Hyde Park.  In Green Park a "naval arch" was erected as a bridge between the park and the lawn of Buckingham House.  The arch was decorated with the names of naval officers: Howe, Duncan, St Vincent, Collingwood, Broke, Saumarez, Exmouth and others.  A royal booth in the park displayed the names "Nelson of the Nile" and "Wellington".

Printers produced numerous keepsakes for the event including depictions of its attractions, which was billed as "the largest fair, for every kind of amusement, that was ever known in this or any other country".

In Dublin, there was a "grand celebration" on the 12, 13, 15 and 16 August 1814, the changed date to accommodate the change to New Style dates. On the 12th, the foundation stone of the General Post Office, Dublin was laid by the Lord Lieutenant of Ireland, Charles Whitworth, 1st Earl Whitworth, attended by the Post-Masters-General, Charles O'Neill, 1st Earl O'Neill and Laurence Parsons, 2nd Earl of Rosse. There was a fireworks display on St Stephen's Green; several trees were cut down to make the display more visible.

The Dublin-based medallist Isaac Parkes (1815–1859) struck a commemorative medal depicting George, The Prince Regent.

The Grand Jubilee was celebrated in Cork on 1–3 August, and Thomas Wyon the elder struck a commemorative bronze medal.

References 

1814 in England
Centennial anniversaries
Public holidays in the United Kingdom
1814 in London
Royal Parks of London